Dhanbad railway division is one of the five railway divisions under East Central Railway zone of Indian Railways. It stands No.1 in revenue earning among all the divisions in Indian Railways. This railway division was formed on 5 November 1951 and its headquarters is located at Dhanbad in the state of Jharkhand of India. It is also No.1 division in coal loading among all railway divisions in Indian Railways. The administrative head of division is called Divisional Railway Manager (DRM). Present DRM is Mr. Ashish Bansal, who is the head of this division.

Danapur railway division, Mughalsarai railway division, Samastipur railway division, and Sonpur railway division are the other railway divisions under ECR Zone headquartered at Hajipur.

List of railway stations and towns 
The list includes the stations under the Dhanbad railway division and their station category.

Stations closed for Passengers -

References

 
Divisions of Indian Railways
1951 establishments in Bihar

Transport in Dhanbad